The term oriundo (Italian plural oriundi) is an Italian, Spanish, and Portuguese noun describing an immigrant in a country, whose ancestry is from that same country. It comes from the Latin verb oriri (orior), "be born", and is etymologically related to Orient.

This term was used especially in Spain to refer to a series of athletes, born in Latin America, whose ancestors were Spanish emigrants. In Italian culture, an oriundo is someone who is living in a country other than the one of his origins (i.e. being of Italian descent and residing outside of Italy). Oriundi are usually foreigners to their country of origin in legal terms. Whether or not they maintain cultural and linguistic ties with their country of origin usually depends on their upbringing, family background and preservation of cultural values.

Overview 
Some oriundi have played for the Italy or Spain national football teams in international competition; among these are some who had previously represented their native country. FIFA requires international footballers to have either citizenship of a country or close ancestral ties to it. Oriundi may qualify under the latter heading; in addition, they can acquire citizenship more easily than immigrants not of native extraction, owing to jus sanguinis. When the Italian and Spanish leagues imposed quotas or bans on "foreign" players, oriundi were partially or totally exempt from these.

Tours by European club sides of Latin America were common from the 1920s to the 1950s; tours in the reverse direction also occurred. European managers often recruited Latin Americans they had seen playing on these tours. The recruitment of dual internationals was greatly reduced by FIFA which ruled in 1964 that a player could not represent more than one country. In the 1960s, with incidents like the Battle of Santiago in the 1962 FIFA World Cup and several finals of the Intercontinental Cup, South American football came to be seen as more violent and defensive, and hence fewer players were recruited.

Italian oriundi
 
The Italian Americans who "returned" to Italy in the 1920s and '30s were known as rimpatriati ("repatriated people").  In Fascist Italy, they automatically had dual citizenship and had no need to undergo naturalization. Vittorio Pozzo, manager of the Italy national team, selected several for the victorious 1934 FIFA World Cup side.  He rebutted critics of this policy by saying "if they can die for Italy, they can play for Italy", a reference to conscription. Enrique Guaita, Scopelli and Stagnaro tried to leave for France to avoid being called up for the Abyssinian campaign in 1936.

Oriundi as a term in Italian football dates from the early 1950s.  The category existed separately from native and foreign players at intervals until the 1970s.  Omar Sivori, Humberto Maschio and Antonio Valentín Angelillo, the three stars of the Argentina national team that won the 1957 Copa América were signed by Italian clubs and given citizenship, thereby missing Argentina's disappointing showing at the 1958 FIFA World Cup.

In 1966, no new foreigners were admitted to the Italian league. Their presence was blamed for the continued underperformance of the national side, culminating at the humiliating defeat by North Korea at that year's World Cup.  The ban was eased when one foreigner per Serie A team was allowed from 1980.

In recent years, the most famous Italian oriundo has been the former Juventus' Italian Argentine footballer Mauro Camoranesi, who was eligible for Italian citizenship through a great-grandfather who in 1873 emigrated from Potenza Picena, in Italy's Marche region, to Argentina. Camoranesi won the 2006 FIFA World Cup with the azzurri.

List of Italian football oriundi
 – Ermanno Aebi – Inter – 1910–22
 - Valerio Alesi - Ascoli, Civitavecchia, Bolzano, Acri, Fermana, Maceratese, Santegidiese - 1985-1998
 - Daniel Alessi - Sasso Marconi - 2018–present
 - John Aloisi - Cremonese - 1995-97
 - Ross Aloisi - Alzano Virescit, Pro Sesto - 2000-03
 – José Altafini – Milan, Napoli, Juventus – 1958–76
 – Amauri Carvalho de Oliveira – Napoli, Piacenza, Chievo, Palermo, Juventus, Parma, Fiorentina, Torino – 2000–02, 2003–16
 – Michele Andreolo – Bologna, Lazio, Napoli – 1935–48
 – Antonio Angelillo – Inter, Roma, Milan, Lecco, Genoa – 1957–69
 - Cristian Ansaldi - Genoa, Internazionale, Torino - 2015–present
 – Emil Audero – Juventus, Venezia, Sampdoria – 2016–present
 - Felipe Avenatti - Ternana, Bologna - 2013-17, 2017–18
 – Emilio Badini – Bologna, Spal – 1913–22
 - Daniel Baldi - Treviso, Teramo - 2006, 2007
 - Amílcar Barbuy - Lazio - 1931-32
 - Walter Baseggio - Treviso - 2006
 - Josias Basso - Ravenna, Reggina - 2008-2010
 - Oscar Basso - Internazionale - 1949-50
 - Gabriel Omar Batistuta - Fiorentina, Roma, Inter - 1991-2003
 – Cristian Battocchio – Udinese- 2010–12
 - Fernando Belluschi - Genoa - 2012
 - Giulio Benedetti - Viterbese - 2021-
 - Gaetano Berardi - Brescia, Sampdoria - 2010-14
 - Edenilson Bergonsi - Varese - 2010
 - Sergio Berti - Parma - 1992-93
 - Daniel Bertoni - Fiorentina, Napoli, Udinese - 1981-87
 - Daniel Bessa - Inter, Vicenza, Bologna, Como, Verona, Genoa - 2012-13, 2014–present
 - Patrick Bettoni - Vicenza, Ascoli, Reggiana - 1998-2002
 - Ludovico Bidoglio - Palermo - 1916-17 
 - Lucas Biglia - Lazio, Milan - 2013-2020
 - Mark Birighitti - Varese - 2015
 - Mario Bolatti - Fiorentina - 2010-11
 - Martino Borghese - Genoa, Viterbese, Pescara, Alghero, Gubbio, Bari, Pro Vercelli, Spezia, Varese, Como, Livorno, Seregno -  2006-2014, 2014–present 
 - Claudio Borghi - Como - 1987 
 - Mauro Boselli - Genoa, Palermo - 2011, 2013
 - Andrés Bottiglieri - Genzano, Valle d’Aosta, Savona, Voghera, Vado Ligure - 2006-2014
 - Daniel Bravo - Parma - 1996-97
 - Mark Bresciano - Empoli, Parma, Palermo, Lazio - 1999-2011
 - Joshua Brillante - Fiorentina, Empoli, Como - 2014-16
 - Daniel Caligiuri - never played in Italy, called up for the Italy national team in 2015
 - Caetano Prósperi Calil - Siena, Crotone, Frosinone, Varese, Salernitana, Catania, Livorno, Siracusa - 2007-2018
 - Tiago Calvano - Perugia, Sambenedettese - 2002-03
 – Mauro Camoranesi – Verona, Juventus – 2000–10
 - Vincent Candela - Roma, Udinese, Siena, Messina - 1997-2005, 2005–07
 - Massimo Cannizzaro - Equipe Romagna - 2003-04
 - Mauro Cantoro - Ascoli - 2001
  — Elio Capradossi — Bari, Roma — 2017–present
 - Wálter Casagrande - Ascoli, Torino - 1987-1993
 - Fabián Carini - Juventus, Internazionale, Cagliari - 2001-02, 2004–07 
 - Diego Cavalieri - Cesena - 2010
 - Edinson Cavani - Palermo, Napoli - 2007-2013
 - Alessandro Celin - Juve Stabia - 2015-16
 - César Cervo de Luca - ChievoVerona, Catania, Padova, Juve Stabia, Cremonese, Virtus Entella, Marina Giulia - 2003-2015, 2018 
 – Renato Cesarini – Juventus – 1929–35
 – Gastón Cellerino – Ligorna 1922 - 2021–present
 – Arturo Chini Ludueña – Roma – 1927–34
 - Davide Chiumiento - Juventus, Siena - 2004-07
 - Jonathan Cícero Moreira - Internazionale, Parma - 2011–2015
 - Gabriel Cichero - Lecce - 2006
 - Enzo Concina - Ravenna, Cesena, Pavia, Piacenza, Monza, Nola, Forlì - 1982-1994
 - Igor Coronado - Trapani, Palermo - 2015-18 
 - Nicolás Corvetto - Udinese, Triestina, Taranto, Südtirol - 2008, 2009–10, 2015–16
 - Hernán Crespo - Parma, Lazio, Internazionale, Milan, Genoa - 1996-2003, 2004–05, 2006-2012
 - Felipe Curcio - Foggia, Lupa Roma, Martina Franca, Fidelis Andria, Brescia - 2013–14, 2015–present
 - Davis Curiale - Campobello di Mazara, Palermo, Sambenedettese, Vicenza, Ravenna, Cittadella, Crotone, Triestina, Grosseto, Frosinone, Trapani, Lecce, Catania - 2004–present
 – Dino da Costa – Roma, Fiorentina, Atalanta, Juventus – 1955–66
 - Caio De Cenco - Boca San Lazzaro, Bellaria, Cesena, Reggiana, Monza, Pavia, SPAL, Pontedera, Pordenone, Trapani, Padova, Pistoiese, Südtirol - 2007–present
 - Nicolas De Santis - Termoli - 1992-93
 - Yago Del Piero - San Marino, Cesena - 2013-15
 - João Paulo di Fabio - Cagliari, Como - 2002-05 
 - Fabio Daprelà - Brescia, Palermo, Carpi, ChievoVerona, Bari - 2010-17
 – Alejandro Demaria – Lazio – 1931–34
 – Paolo Dellafiore – Treviso, Palermo, Torino, Parma, Cesena, Novara, Siena – 2005–13
 – Attilio Demaria – Inter, Novara, Legnano – 1932–36, 1938–46
 - Mattia Desole - Monza, Foligno - 2012-13
 – Alfredo Devincenzi – Inter – 1934–36
 – Roberto Di Matteo – Lazio – 1993–96
 - Daniele Dichio - Sampdoria, Lecce - 1997-98
  - Tony Dorigo - Torino - 1997-98
 - Dunga Bledorn Verri - Pisa, Fiorentina, Pescara - 1987-1993
 - Paulo Dybala - Palermo, Juventus - 2011-present
 – Éder Citadin Martins – Empoli, Brescia, Cesena, Sampdoria, Inter – 2006–07, 2010–present
 - Rodrigo Ely - Milan, Reggina, Varese, Avellino - 2012-17
 - Antonio Esposito - Cagliari, Varese - 2001-02, 2004–05
 - Christian Esposito - Albinoleffe, Novara, Pro Vercelli, Catanzaro, Savona - 2009-2012, 2013-4
 – Ricardo Faccio – Inter – 1933–36
 - César Falletti - Ternana, Bologna, Palermo - 2013–present
 – Otávio Fantoni – Lazio – 1930–35
 - Frank Farina - Bari - 1991-92
 - Federico Fazio - Roma - 2016–present 
 - Adam Federici - Torres - 2003-04
 – Francisco Fedullo – Bologna – 1930–39
 - Michael Ferrante - Comprens Stabia, Benevento - 2001-04
 - Gabriel Ferrari - Perugia, Foggia, Ternana - 2008-2010
 - Matteo Ferrari - Genoa, Lecce, Bari, Internazionale, Parma, Roma, Genoa - 1997-2009 
 - Gustavo Ferretti - Chioggia, Savona, Viterbese, Marsala, Venezia, Legnago, Marano, Padova, Imolese, Modena - 2004–present
 – Emanuele Figliola – Genoa – 1935–38
  – Edwin Ronald Firmani – Sampdoria, Inter, Genoa – 1955–63
 – Enrique Flamini – Lazio – 1939–52, 1953–54
 – Fernando Forestieri – Genoa, Siena, Vicenza, Udinese, Empoli, Bari – 2006–09, 2010–12
 - Bruno Fornaroli - Sampdoria - 2008-09, 2010–11, 2011–12
 – Jorginho – Sambonifacese, Verona, Napoli – 2010–present
 - Armando Frigo - Vicenza, Fiorentina, Spezia - 1934-1943 
 – Francesco Frione – Inter – 1932–35
 – Elisio Gabardo – Milan, Liguria, Genoa – 1935–41
 - Giancarlo Gallifuoco - Rieti - 2018–present
 - Salvatore Gambino - Trapani, Gubbio, Grosseto - 2010-15
 - Gianluca Gaudino - ChievoVerona - 2017-18
 - Giuseppe Gemiti - Udinese, Genoa, Modena, ChievoVerona, Piacenza, Novara, Livorno, Bari, Cremonese - 2002-2017
 – Alcides Ghiggia – Roma, Milan – 1953–62
 - Guillermo Giacomazzi - Lecce, Palermo, Empoli, Siena, Perugia - 2001-2015
 - Dez Giraldi - Empoli, Cuiopelli Cappiano - 2004-05
 – Guerino Gottardi – Lazio – 1995-05
 - Giulio Giuricich - Sassuolo, Montichiari, Castellana, Gallaratese - 2008-2012
 - Vincenzo Grella - Empoli, Ternana, Parma, Torino - 1998-2008
 - Vincenzo Grifo - never played in Italy, called up for the Italy national team in 2018 
 - Simone Grippo - ChievoVerona, Piacenza, Lumezzane, Frosinone - 2008-2011
 – Enrique Guaita – Roma – 1933–35
 – Anfilogino Guarisi – Lazio – 1931–37
 - Nicola Guglielmelli - Hellas Verona, Prato, Mantova - 2017–present
 - Andrés Guglielminpietro - Milan, Internazionale, Bologna - 1998-2004
 – Gabriel Heinze – Roma – 2011-12
 - Dennis Iapichino - Siena, Livorno - 2016–present
 - Mauro Icardi - Sampdoria, Internazionale - 2012–present
 – Paolo Innocenti – Bologna, Napoli – 1924–37
 – Ignacio Jeraldino – Parma – 2014–15
 - Frankie Lagana - Empoli - 2003-05
 - Vincent Laurini - Fossombrone, Carpi, Empoli, Fiorentina - 2008–present
 – Cristian Ledesma – Lecce, Lazio, Pro Piacenza – 2001–15, 2018–present
 - Lucas Pezzini Leiva - Lazio - 2017–present
 – Julio Libonatti – Torino, Genoa – 1926–36
 – Francisco Lojacono – Vicenza, Fiorentina, Roma, Sampdoria – 1956–65
 – Cesare Lovati - Milan - 1910-1922
 - Adrian Madaschi - Atalanta, Monza, Pistoiese, Grosseto, Portogruaro Summaga - 2000-03, 2005-2011
 - Mattia Maggio - Novara, Mantova - 2011-13, 2016
 - John Maisano - Atalanta - 1997-98
 - Thomas Mangani - ChievoVerona - 2014-15
 - Doni Marangon - Roma - 2005-2011
 - Luiz Felipe Ramos Marchi - Salernitana, Lazio - 2016–present
 - Massimo Margiotta - Pescara, Cosenza, Lecce, Reggiana, Udinese, Vicenza, Perugia, Piacenza, Frosinone, Barletta - 1994-2011
 – Leandro Martínez – Parma – 2007–08
 – Rinaldo Martino – Juventus – 1949–50
 – Ernesto Mascheroni – Inter – 1934–36
 – Humberto Maschio – Bologna, Atalanta, Inter, Fiorentina – 1957–66
 – José Mauri – Parma, Milan – 2013–present
 - Miguel Mea Vitali - Poggibonsi, Lazio, Sora - 2003, 2004–05
 - Cristian Menin - Pro Vasto, Massese - 2007-09
 - Joe Montemurro - Treviso - 1991-95
 - Paolo Montero - Atalanta, Juventus - 1992-2005
 – Luis Monti – Juventus – 1930–39
 – Miguel Montuori – Fiorentina – 1956–61
 - Davide Moscardelli - Maccarese, Guidonia Montecelio, Sangiovannese, Triestina, Rimini, Cesena, Piacenza, ChievoVerona, Bologna, Lecce, Arezzo, Pisa - 1997–present
 – Giovanni Moscardini – Lucchese, Pisa, Genoa – 1919–??
 – Thiago Motta – Genoa, Inter – 2008–12
 - Norberto Murata Neto - Fiorentina, Juventus - 2011-17
 - Andrea Orlandi - Novara - 2017-18
 – Raimundo Orsi – Juventus – 1928–35
 – Pablo Daniel Osvaldo – Fiorentina, Bologna, Roma, Juventus, Inter – 2007–10, 2011–15
 – Gabriel Paletta – Parma, Milan, Atalanta – 2010–18
 – Emerson Palmieri – Roma – 2015–18
 - Vincenzo Palumbo - Fidelis Andria, Empoli, Pescara, Palermo, Torres, Pisa, Olbia, Virtus Casarano, Tavolara, Viterbese, Nuorese, Castelsardo, Calangianus, Albarossa, Golfo Aranci - 1995–present
 - Howard Passadoro - Genoa - 1898-1903
 - Daniel Passarella - Fiorentina, Internazionale - 1982-88
 - Javier Pastore - Palermo, Roma - 2009-2011, 2018–present
 — Simone Perrotta - Reggina, Juventus, Bari, Chievo, Roma — 1995-2013
 – Bruno Pesaola – Roma, Novara, Napoli, Genoa – 1947–62
 - Raoul Petretta - never played in Italy, but called up for the Under-21 national team in 2018
 - Germán Pezzella - Fiorentina - 2017–present
 - Mauricio Pinilla - Internazionale, ChievoVerona, Grosseto, Palermo, Cagliari, Genoa, Atalanta - 2003-04, 2009-2017
 - Reno Piscopo - Renate - 2017–present
 - Michel Platini - Juventus - 1982-87
 - Sandro Porchia - Ragusa, Savoia, Crotone, Rimini, Grosseto, Cosenza, Bassano, San Nicolò, Ribelle - 1996-2014
 – Roberto Porta – Inter – 1934–36
 - Jacob Poscoliero - SandonàJesolo, Bassano - 2010-13
 - Lucas Pratto - Genoa - 2011-12
 - Silvio Proto - Lazio - 2018-21
 – Ettore Puricelli – Bologna, Milan – 1938–49
 - Rafael Severo Refatti - Reggiana, Trento, Conegliano, Chioggia, Cervia - 2001-03, 2005–06, 2006–09
 - Gustavo Reggi - Reggina, Crotone - 1999-2001
 - Vincenzo Rennella - Cesena - 2011-12
 – Eduardo Ricagni – Juventus, Milan, Torino – 1953–58
 - Nicholas Rizzo - Ternana, Ancona, Prato - 2000-04
 - Rômulo – Fiorentina, Verona, Juventus – 2011–present
 – Humberto Rosa – Sampdoria, Padova, Juventus, Napoli – 1954–64
 - Giuseppe Rossi – Parma, Fiorentina, Genoa – 2007, 2013–2018
 - Hugo Daniel Rubini - Viterbese, Juventus, Tempio, Casale, Fiorenzuola, Ravenna, Ancona, Spezia, Forte dei Marmi, Carrarese - 1986-2008
 - Oscar Ruggeri - Ancona - 1992
 – Attila Sallustro – Napoli – 1925–37
 - Nicola Sansone - Crotone, Parma, Sassuolo - 2011-16 
 – Raffaele Sansone – Bologna, Napoli – 1931–45
 – Fabiano Santacroce – Napoli, Parma – 2008–13, 2014–15
 - Giovanni Savarese - Perugia, Viterbese, Torres - 2000, 2003 
 – Ezequiel Schelotto – Cesena, Catania, Atalanta, Inter, Sassuolo, Parma, Chievo – 2010–15
 – Juan Alberto Schiaffino – Milan, Roma – 1954–62
 - Enzo Scifo - Inter, Torino - 1987-88, 1991–93
 – Alejandro Scopelli – Roma – 1933–35
 – Pedro Sernagiotto – Juventus – 1932–34
 - Franco Signorelli - Empoli, Ternana, Spezia, Salernitana - 2010–present
 - Giovanni Simeone - Genoa, Fiorentina - 2016–present
 – Omar Sívori – Juventus, Napoli – 1957–69
 - Simon Sluga - Spezia - 2015-16
 - Davide Somma - Pro Vasto, Olbia - 2005-08
 - Roberto Soriano - Empoli, Sampdoria, Torino - 2010-16, 2018–present
 – Angelo Sormani – Mantova, Roma, Sampdoria, Milan, Napoli, Fioentina, Vicenza – 1961–76
 — Gabriel Strefezza — SPAL, Juve Stabia — 2017–present
 - Christian Stuani - Reggina - 2008-09
 - Dario Tanda - Montegiorgio - 2017
 - Alex Nicolao Telles - Internazionale - 2015-16
 - Daniele Tiatto - Salernitana - 1996-97
 - Rômulo Eugênio Togni - Bellunoponte, Mandfredonia, Arezzo, Sorrento, Pescara, Avellino, SPAL, Maceratese, Cuneo, Mezzolara - 2002-2017
 - Rafael Toloi – Roma, Atalanta – 2014–present
 - James Troisi - Atalanta - 2012-13
 – Ulisse Uslenghi – Livorno, Napoli – 1933–38
 - Angelo Vaccaro - Sorrento - 2010-11
 - Carl Valeri - SPAL, Grosseto, Sassuolo, Ternana - 2004-2014
 – Franco Vázquez – Palermo – 2011–12, 2014–16
 - André Viapiana - Triestina, Reggiana, Riese - 2004-05, 2009–14, 2014-present
 - Massimiliano Vieri - Prato, Fano, Brescello, Ancona, Verona, Napoli, Ternana, Triestina, Arezzo, Novara, Lecco, Prato - 1997-2012
 – Giuseppe Wilson – Lazio – 1969–79
 - Antônio Carlos Zago - Roma - 1998-2002
 - Javier Zanetti - Inter - 1995-2014
 - Massimo Zappino - Catania, Acireale, Nocerina, Frosinone, ChievoVerona, Pro Sesto, Foggia, Lecco, Taranto, Como, Varese - 2000-2018

Italian rugby oriundi
The number of Argentines playing rugby in Italy has increased since the sport embraced professionalism in 1995, while the Argentine league system remains amateur. (Professionals, however, including those based in Europe, are eligible to play for the Argentina national team, and the country's national federation has created a domestic professional player pool for the national team; see also Pampas XV and Jaguares (Super Rugby).)  Italian rugby also allows naturalized foreigners.  Restrictions on changing nationality are less strict in rugby than in soccer, and three years' residency qualifies.  Oriundi capped by the Italy national team include:

List of Italian basketball oriundi
  - Pablo Albertinazzi - Rieti, San Severo, Catanzaro, Cagliari, Corato, Maddaloni, Capo d’Orlando - 2001-03, 2005–11
  - Patrick Baldassarre - Treviso, College Italia, Treviglio, Lago Maggiore, Sassari, Scafati, Fortitudo Bologna, Trapani, Reggio Calabria - 2002–present. 
  - Pablo Bertone - Pesaro, Varese- 2017–present. 
  - Anthony Binetti - Fortitudo Bologna, Castelletto Ticino, Cantù, Brindisi, Sassari, Veroli - 2006-07, 2008–13
  - Yann Bonato - Pesaro, Reggio Emilia - 1997-99 
  - George Bucci - Siena, Fortitudo Bologna, Montecatini - 1977-92
  - Ryan Bucci - Ozzano, Ragusa, Osimo, Soresina, Juvi Cremona, Barcellona Pozzo di Gotto, Ferentino, Ferrara, Agrigento - 2003-17
  - Sebastián Cacciola - Roseto, Montecatini, Sassari, Taranto, Napoli, Rimini - 2003-04, 2005, 2005–08, 2009
  - Dante Calabria - Livorno, Trieste, Treviso, Cantù, Milano, Fortitudo, Soresina, Sant’Antimo - 1996-97, 2000–01, 2002–09, 2010. 
  - Juan Marcos Casini - Jesi, Cantù, Pistoia, Scafati, Napoli, Ferentino, Casale, Reggio Calabria, Ravenna, Recanati, Rieti - 2003-08, 2009–present. 
  - Óscar Chiaramello - San Severo, Osimo, Montegranaro, Pistoia, Recanati, Stamura - 1999-01, 2000–01, 2001–02, 2002–03, 2003–13
  - Albano Chiarastella - Bernalda, Potenza, Massafra, Agrigento, Biella - 2006–present
  - David Chiotti - Casale, Milano, Brindisi - 2009-14
  - Matt Costello - Avellino - 2018–present
  - Mike D'Antoni - Milano as player - 1977-90 - Milano, Treviso as coach - 1990-97, 2001–02
  - Enrico De Carli - Mazzini Bologna, Varese, Cantù - 1958-60, 1963–65
  - Samuel Deguara - Treviso, Caorle, Bari, Reggio Emilia - 2007-13
  - Carlos Delfino - Reggio Calabria, Fortitudo Bologna, Torino - 2000-04, 2018–present 
  - Vinny Del Negro - Treviso, Fortitudo Bologna - 1990-92, 1999
  - Ross DeRogatis - Capo d'Orlando - 2007
  - Agustín Fabi - Patti, Treviglio, Reggio Calabria, Treviso - 2010–present. 
  - Juan Manuel Fabi - Castellano Massafra, Capo d’Orlando, Imola - 2003-09
  - Daniel Farabello - Varese, Ferrara - 2003-06, 2007-11. 
  - Ariel Filloy - Sassari, Rimini, Milano, Soresina, Scafati, Pistoia, Trieste, Reggio Emilia, Venezia, Avellino - 2003–present
  - Demián Filloy - Porto Torres, Rimini, Montegranaro, Reggio Emilia, Trapani, Roma - 2002-14, 2015–17, 2018-present. 
  - Bruno Fitipaldo - Capo d’Orlando, Avellino - 2016, 2017–present
  - Toto Forray - Messina, Padova, Jesolo, Forlì, Trento - 2003–present. 
  - Frédéric Forte - Avellino, Scafati - 2003-05
  - Roberto Gabini - Rimini, Roma, Napoli, Jesi - 2003-04, 2007–10
  - Anthony Gennari - Varese, Forlì, Pall.Milano, Venezia, Rieti - 1964-76
  - Mario Ghersetti - Porto Torres, Veroli, Vigevano, Brescia, Verona, Ferentino, Reggio Calabria, Bergamo, Orzinuovi - 2001-13, 2014–present.  
  - Nicolás Gianella - Reggio Calabria, Scafati, Cantù - 2000-01, 2002–03, 2011–12
  - Mario Gigena - Livorno, Jesi, Varese, Milano, Rieti, Veroli, Ostuni, Fabriano, Recanati, Don Bosco Livorno, Piombino, Labronica Livorno, Cecina - 1995-2012, 2013–present. 
  - Silvio Gigena - Livorno, Virtus Bologna, Milano, Pesaro, Udine, Scafati, Soresina, Fortitudo Bologna, Massafra, Ostuni, Bari, Libertas Livorno - 1995-2013
  - Manu Ginóbili - Reggio Calabria, Virtus Bologna - 1998-02
  - Anthony Giovacchini - Avellino, Roseto, Montecatini, Virtus Bologna, Reggio Calabria, Casale, Fabriano, Napoli, Milano, Cantù, Brindisi, Veroli - 2002-12
  - Guilherme Giovannoni - Rimini, Biella, Treviso, Virtus Bologna - 2002-04, 2005–06, 2005–09  
  - Peter Guarasci - Pesaro, Roseto, Rimini, Reggio Emilia - 1996-99, 2000–01, 2002–08
  - Mike Iuzzolino - Verona, Roma, Milano, Pavia - 1995-01, 2002–03
  - Antonio Maestranzi - Reggio Calabria, Jesi, Montegranaro, Roma - 2006-2012
  - Nicolás Mazzarino - Reggio Calabria, Cantù - 2001-13
  - Phil Melillo - Lazio, Treviso, Rieti, Roma as player - 1976-77, 1983-86 - Forlì, Verona, Siena, Roseto, Udine, Pesaro, Novara, Montecatini as coach - 1994-04, 2005–07, 2008–09, 2012-13
  - Alex Mitola - Ceglie - 2016-17
  - Alejandro Montecchia - Reggio Calabria, Milano - 1999-03, 2006
  - Paulo César Motta - Roseto, Trapani, Brindisi, Ostuni, Corato, Ceglie - 2001, 2002–13, 2014
  - Alejandro Muro - Scafati, Palestrina, Novara, Montegranaro, Casale, Firenze, Brindisi, Latina, Fortitudo Bologna - 2001, 2001–10
  - Bernardo Musso - Pergamino, Licata, Alghero, Olbia, Fossombrone, Udine, Brescia, Perugia, Napoli, Forlì, Pesaro, Ferentino, Treviso - 2002-15, 2016–present. 
  - Mike Nardi - Napoli, Montecatini, Avellino, Pesaro, Pavia, Milano, Forlì, Mantova, Latina - 2007-12, 2013–15
  - Ryan Pettinella - Montegranaro, Veroli, Recanati - 2008-09, 2013–14
  - Antonio Porta - Imola, Livorno, Biella, Avellino, Verona, Scafati, Udine - 2002-07, 2008–13, 2016
  - Anthony Raffa - Roma, Orzinuovi - 2016-17, 2017
  - Nicolás Richotti - Bari, Agropoli, Rovigo - 2005-08
  - Mason Rocca - Jesi, Napoli, Milano, Virtus Bologna - 2001-15
  - Joel Salvi - Jesi, Imola, Scafati, Ferrara, Vigevano, Reggio Emilia - 2004-11
  - Matt Santangelo - Cantù, Rieti, Treviso - 2000-01, 2005–06
  - Brian Scalabrine - Treviso - 2011 
  - Germán Scarone - Treviso, Cervia, Rimini, Montecatini, Siena, Virtus Bologna, Pesaro, Reggio Calabria, Rimini, Piacenza, Monsummano, Bellaria - 1993–present. 
  - Laurent Sciarra - Treviso - 1997-98
  - Hugo Sconochini - Reggio Calabria, Milano, Roma, Virtus Bologna, Piacentina, Segrate, Monticelli - 1990-96, 1997-01, 2002–12
  - Jonathan Tavernari - Biella, Pistoia, Scafati, Tortona, Agropoli, Siena, Sassari - 2011-13, 2014–present.
  - Joe Trapani - Casale, Forlì - 2011-12 
  - Marc Trasolini - Pesaro, Avellino, Agropoli - 2013-16
  - Marko Verginella - Udine, Reggio Calabria, Fabriano, Rieti, Sassari - 2004-08
  - Jeff Viggiano - Pavia, Milano, Biella, Treviso, Brindisi, Siena, Venezia - 2008-17
  - Bruno Zanotti - Reggio Emilia, Jesi - 2006-07

Spanish oriundos
Few South Americans played football in Spain before World War II.  Spain under General Franco allowed for dual nationality with Latin American countries from 1954. Players such as Alfredo Di Stéfano, José Santamaría and Héctor Rial quickly transferred, and helped make Real Madrid the dominant club of the early years of the European Cup. In 1962, the Spanish League banned all foreign players, as their presence was blamed for the poor performance of the national team. Oriundi were allowed if they had not been capped by their native country. As a result, clubs were anxious to prove Spanish ancestry for would-be imports, resulting in some dubious cases. Some players obtained forged birth certificates, providing spurious Spanish ancestors. This was easy in Paraguay during the corrupt dictatorship of Alfredo Stroessner. Consequent scandals emerged at various times, including one exposed by FC Barcelona in 1972. In 1973, to reduce the incentive for corruption, up to two non-oriundi foreigners were allowed per team. Nevertheless, the recruiting of Latin American players continued so strong the Argentine FA in preparation for hosting the 1978 FIFA World Cup forbade its preliminary squad of 40 from moving abroad, lest they be "poached". Spain reduced the number of oriundi to one per team after another forgery scandal in 1979. From 1979 to 1982, no Argentines were allowed abroad, and many like Mario Kempes returned home.

Real Madrid legend Alfredo Di Stéfano is a notable example; he was born in Argentina and played for the Argentina national team, but later obtained Spanish citizenship and represented Spain at the 1962 FIFA World Cup.

See also 
 Grannygate
 Haigui
 List of naturalised Spanish international football players

External links 
 Oriundi: Games, goals, captains from Forza Azzurri fansite.

References 
 

Spanish people of Italian descent
Italian words and phrases
Italian people of Spanish descent
Spanish words and phrases
Association football in South America
Change of nationality in sport